Claudia Fischbach is a German biophysicist who is the Stanley Bryer 1946 Professor of Biomedical Engineering at Cornell University. She is Director of the Cornell Physical Sciences Oncology Centre on the Physics of Cancer Metabolism.

Early life and education 
Fischbach-Teschl earned a master's degree in pharmacy from the Ludwig Maximilian University of Munich. She worked toward her doctorate in pharmaceutical technology at the University of Regensburg. She then moved to Harvard University, where she worked in engineering.

Research and career 
In 2007, Fischbach joined Cornell University, where she started using biomedical engineering to better understand how to treat cancer. The progression of cancer is influenced by cellular interactions with nearby cells and the extracellular matrix. Despite that, the majority of cancer studies do not replicate conditions outside of the body. Fischbach-Teschl uses tissue engineering to design systems that let her model and investigate tumor cells. She uses model systems to understand the biological strategies tumors take to modify bodily function, become more aggressive and metastasize.

Fischbach has extensively investigated the fundamental mechanisms that underpin breast cancer. For example, she showed that obesity can change the consistence of breast tissue, which can promote the disease. She was supported by the Human Frontier Science Program to study the impact of breast cancer on bone progression  She showed that exercise, which is often prescribed to tackle bone loss, could help to protect people against cancer. Her research showed that breast cancer can trigger distant bone growth, which could be a preemptive defence against metastasis.

Awards and honors 
 2015 Public Voices Fellow of The OpEd Project
 2016 American Institute for Medical and Biological Engineering 
 2017 Alexander von Humboldt Foundation
 2022 Cornell University College of Engineering EPICC Collaboration Award
 2023 Biomedical Engineering Society Cellular and Molecular Bioengineering Momentum Award

Selected publications

References 

Year of birth missing (living people)
Living people
German biophysicists
Women biophysicists
21st-century German biologists
21st-century German physicists
21st-century German women scientists
Ludwig Maximilian University of Munich alumni
University of Regensburg alumni
Harvard University people
German emigrants to the United States
Cornell University faculty